R v Hancock [1985] UKHL 9 is an English legal decision of the highest court setting out the relationship between foresight of consequences and intention in cases of murder. It refers to the case of the killing of David Wilkie. The defendants' stated intention had been to frighten a person, but another was killed. The law, as the judgement of the whole court (a per curiam decision) was held to hinge on the relationship between foresight of the range of results of taking a particular action and the result of that action which must include a specific direction or legal mention of considering the probability of death or serious injury resulting, and other directions which explain the difference between the offence of manslaughter and that of murder.

Facts
During the 1984-1985 miners' strike, the defendants dropped a concrete block from a bridge with the later-stated intention of scaring a coal miner being taken to work in a taxi. Instead, the taxi driver, David Wilkie, was killed. During questioning, the defendants admitted intending to frighten the miner out of attending work, but denied an intention to kill or cause serious injury to him. At the trial, their offer to plead guilty to manslaughter was rejected by the prosecution, who pursued convictions for murder.

Trial
The trial judge directed the jury per R v Moloney that

The jury, after some deliberation, sought clarification because  and the judge gave a further direction but did not expand on his previous guidance. Verdicts of guilty were returned and the defendants sentenced to life imprisonment.

Appeals
The Court of Appeal found that the judge's use of the Moloney guidelines may have misled the jury as they had been given no guidance as to the weight to be given to the actual foresight of a consequence (i.e. death or serious bodily harm) in determining the intent to cause that consequence. It was ruled that this omission was fatal, as in Moloney it had been stated that  Since this guidance had not been available to the jury, the Court substituted verdicts of manslaughter, and the prosecution then appealed.

The House of Lords reviewed the Moloney guidelines issued by itself, and cited the main principles that:

The court agreed with the Court of Appeal in deciding that the Moloney guidelines were defective in that the issue (test) of probability should specifically be addressed (mentioned) by the trial judge, and since that had not occurred in the present case, the prosecutor's appeal was dismissed, and the convictions for manslaughter stood.

References
Judgement: 

English criminal case law
1985 in British law
House of Lords cases
1985 in case law
UK miners' strike (1984–1985)